Marcus Stuart Phillips (born 17 October 1973) is an English retired professional footballer who played as a winger in England, the Netherlands, Australia, Singapore, Malaysia and New Zealand.

Career
Born in Trowbridge, Phillips began his career with Swindon Town, making one League Cup appearance in the 1992–93 season. He then played for non-league clubs Cheltenham Town and Gloucester City. He also played for Dutch club FC Utrecht, signing for them in March 1996 until the end of the season, and making 7 appearances in the Eredivisie. He then returned to non-league Football with Witney Town. He signed for Oxford United in February 1997, making one appearance in the Football League.

He later played in Australia, Singapore, Malaysia and New Zealand for Sydney United, Marconi Stallions, Olympic Sharks, Canberra Cosmos, Sengkang Marine, Brunei, Northern Spirit, Blacktown City, Geylang United, Albany United, Auckland City and Waitakere United.

References

1973 births
Living people
People from Trowbridge
English footballers
Swindon Town F.C. players
Cheltenham Town F.C. players
Gloucester City A.F.C. players
FC Utrecht players
Witney Town F.C. players
Oxford United F.C. players
Sydney United 58 FC players
Marconi Stallions FC players
Sydney Olympic FC players
Canberra Cosmos FC players
Hougang United FC players
Brunei (Malaysia Premier League team) players
Northern Spirit FC players
Blacktown City FC players
Geylang International FC players
Albany United players
Auckland City FC players
Waitakere United players
Eredivisie players
English Football League players
Association football wingers
English expatriate footballers
English expatriate sportspeople in the Netherlands
Expatriate footballers in the Netherlands
English expatriate sportspeople in Australia
Expatriate soccer players in Australia
English expatriate sportspeople in Singapore
Expatriate footballers in Singapore
English expatriate sportspeople in Brunei
Expatriate footballers in Brunei
English expatriate sportspeople in New Zealand
Expatriate association footballers in New Zealand
National Soccer League (Australia) players